Tara Lyn Subkoff (born December 10, 1972) is an American actress, conceptual artist, director, and fashion designer. Subkoff made her film debut in the thriller When the Bough Breaks (1994) opposite Martin Sheen, and has had supporting roles in As Good as It Gets (1997), The Last Days of Disco (1998), The Cell (2000), and The Notorious Bettie Page (2005).

In 2001, she co-founded an art collective-turned-fashion line, Imitation of Christ, which featured pieces hand-sewn solely from recycled vintage and thrift store clothing, and has since worked primarily as a conceptual artist. In 2015, she made her feature film directorial debut with the horror film #Horror (2015), which was picked up for distribution by IFC Midnight.

Early life
Subkoff was born in Westport, Connecticut. Her father was an antiques dealer who owned an antique store on 13th Street in Manhattan, and her mother was a schoolteacher in East Harlem. She grew up in what she described as a "bohemian" family, and attended boarding school at the Williston Northampton School in Massachusetts. After graduation, she attended the Parsons School of Design, but dropped out within a year of enrolling. She relocated to Los Angeles, California in 1991 to study acting, and took classes alongside Angelina Jolie and Keanu Reeves.

Career

Early acting: 1994–2000
Subkoff made her debut as an actress on television, appearing in Dr. Quinn, Medicine Woman in 1994, followed by her feature film debut, a lead role in the 1994 crime thriller When the Bough Breaks, opposite Martin Sheen and Ron Perlman. In 1996, she had a minor supporting part in the film Freeway, and in the horror film Black Circle Boys (1997).

This was followed with lead roles in the drama All Over Me (1997), and the comedy Lover Girl (1997), co-starring Kristy Swanson. She had minor parts in As Good as It Gets (1997), Whit Stillman's The Last Days of Disco (1998), and an uncredited appearance in the 1999 teen sex comedy American Pie. She also appeared in a supporting role in the sci-fi-horror film The Cell (2000) with Jennifer Lopez and Vincent D'Onofrio.

In 2017, Subkoff joined the group of women making the Harvey Weinstein sexual abuse allegations, saying that the producer had sexually harassed her in the 1990s when she applied for a role in one of his films, and then had her blacklisted when she resisted. "It became impossible for me to get work as an actress after this, so I then had to start a new career path and started Imitation of Christ", she said.

Imitation of Christ: 2001–2011
In 2000, Subkoff began working on a project called Imitation of Christ with designer Matt Damhave, enlisting Chloë Sevigny as the project's creative director. Originally conceived as an art project, it has been described as "DIY art collective misconstrued as a luxury fashion label." Every piece of clothing in the line was sewn by hand and recycled from vintage, thrift and Goodwill shops. Subkoff created pieces of wearable art with her fashion shows which garnered her a cult following. Models who wore the pieces for runway shows included actress Scarlett Johansson.

Reflecting on the line, Subkoff said: “We were talking about waste, throwing things away, and taking something that’s old and making it new again, putting the human hand back into a world that reeks of manufacturing. It felt very appropriate to do that in 2000."

Subkoff and Damhave created four collections together, and the shows were described as "guerilla-style, at least as much performance art as they were about [Subkoff's] refashioned, hand-sewn vintage clothes," with the project's earliest exhibitions taking place in a funeral parlor in the Manhattan's East Village. In 2003, she also collaborated with Bernhard Willhelm on a fashion collection inspired and authorized by Roberto Capucci.

After Subkoff and Damhave parted ways, she continued to design pieces for the line through 2006. In 2007, Subkoff sold the label to Josh Sparks, the former chief executive of the Australian label Sass & Bide, for a reported $2 million. The following year, in 2008, the label went out of business. In 2012, Subkoff revived the label and began working on more pieces, shortening the brand name to simply  "Imitation."

Directing, other projects: 2012–present

In 2012, Subkoff created a ten-day art installation and continuous performance piece at the Carlton Festival of the Arts in São Paulo, Brazil. She also conceptualized a performance piece in a group show curated by Dimitri Antonitsis in Hydra, Greece.

She exhibited a three hour long installation at the Bortolami Gallery in New York City during the 2012 New York Fashion Week titled "This is Not a Fashion Show," which featured a girl's choir in leotards performing “Carol of the Bells” (intimated as a "slight to Yuletide consumerism") and "performers aging from 8 to 70 pruned and posing in front of antique mirrors lining the gallery walls." In explaining the idea behind the show, Subkoff said: "We are a society that only sells commodities. We do not create anything unless it's to be bought and sold, so the idea of doing something where there isn't a commodity to sell, or what the commodity is to sell is very confusing, is extremely interesting to me."

In 2013, she collaborated with Milla Jovovich on a filmed installation in Venice, Italy titled "Future/Perfect," which had Jovovich enclosed in a glass house, surrounded by boxes with consumer logos, artwork, and clothing.

Though working predominantly in art, Subkoff also had a minor appearance in the film, including Tanner Hall (2009) and Abandoned (2010), with Brittany Murphy. Subkoff made her directorial debut in 2014 with the horror film #Horror (2015), which details a group of wealthy adolescent girls who experience a night of violence and terror after a social media game is tinged with cyberbullying. The film was screened out of competition at the 2015 Cannes Film Festival, and was picked up for distribution by IFC Midnight, slated for a limited release in November 2015. According to Subkoff, she conceived the film after a conversation she'd had with her friend's daughter: "[The idea] started because I asked my friend's daughter, "What is horror, to you?" This girl was cyberbullied very badly... Now, I was bullied badly as a kid, but I could always change schools. I could always go home. Now you can't…when bullying follows you home, and there's no escape and no end, to me, that's horror. And to so many girls, that's just life."

Personal life
Subkoff has been formerly romantically linked to Wes Anderson, and was formerly engaged to director Tom Hooper. In the fall of 2014, Subkoff married artist Urs Fischer. Subkoff gave birth to a daughter, Grace, in May 2016. In June 2016, it was reported that Subkoff and Fischer had filed for divorce. Subkoff resides in Los Angeles, California, where she bought a three-story house designed by architect Saul Harris Brown in the Silver Lake neighbourhood for $2.25 million in 2021.

In 2009, Subkoff was diagnosed with an acoustic neuroma, a benign brain tumor that required her to undergo a craniotomy in September 2009. Her symptoms had originally been diagnosed as TMJ by her doctor in 2003.

Filmography

Film

Television

As director or producer

References

External links

 
 ArtInfo interview

1972 births
American conceptual artists
Women conceptual artists
American fashion designers
American film actresses
Living people
People from Westport, Connecticut
Actresses from Connecticut
20th-century American actresses
21st-century American actresses
Williston Northampton School alumni
Parsons School of Design alumni
American women fashion designers